Álvaro de Arana Churruca (22 June 1887 – 16 July 1937) was a Spanish sailor who competed in the 1928 Summer Olympics in Amsterdam, Netherlands. He was killed in action during the Spanish Civil War.

References

1887 deaths
1937 deaths
Sailors at the 1928 Summer Olympics – 6 Metre
Olympic sailors of Spain
Spanish male sailors (sport)
Sportspeople from Bilbao
Sailors (sport) from the Basque Country (autonomous community)
Spanish casualties of the Spanish Civil War